The 2022 Minnesota Attorney General election was held on November 8, 2022, to elect the attorney general of the U.S. state of Minnesota. Incumbent DFLer Keith Ellison won reelection to a second term against Republican challenger Jim Schultz.

This attorney general election marked the fourteenth in a row won by the DFL. Schultz improved over 2018 Republican nominee Doug Wardlow in rural counties, but Ellison's increased margins in the Twin Cities metropolitan area were too much to overcome. It was the closest attorney general race in the state since 1956, and the second-closest ever.

Background 
Minnesota's Attorney General is the chief legal officer of the state, tasked with representing over 100 state agencies in legal proceedings. The attorney general also enforces some consumer protection regulations, such as anti-trust laws. While most cases the office undertakes are civil in nature, the attorney general may assist counties with complex criminal cases.

History and nature of the office 
Prior to the 2022 election, Minnesota Republicans had not won the attorney general's office thirteen times in row since 1966 when Douglas Head won the office, and Republicans had only held the office for 4 years since 1954. The office has also been a launching pad for candidates to run for the governorship; every Minnesota Attorney General since Head has gone on to run for governor.

Synopsis of Ellison's tenure 
In 2018, then-U.S. Representative Keith Ellison was elected to replace retiring fellow DFLer Lori Swanson, who ran unsuccessfully for governor. Ellison was the first Black person elected to statewide office in Minnesota, and the first Muslim elected to any statewide office in the United States.

As Attorney General, Ellison played a key role in the state's prosecution of Derek Chauvin and pushed for policing reforms in the aftermath of the murder of George Floyd. Ellison's role greatly increased his influence and notoriety nationally and internationally.

Ellison also led his office's legal actions against businesses which violated COVID-19-related restrictions. This included both businesses which opened for in-person service in violation of public health orders, and some which engaged in illegal price gouging.

Democratic–Farmer–Labor primary
Ellison announced that he would run for reelection on November 15, 2021. Bill Dahn, a perennial candidate, also ran.

Only Ellison sought the DFL endorsement at the party's May 2022 convention. He won endorsement unanimously and went on to win the primary convincingly.

Candidates

Nominee
Keith Ellison, incumbent Attorney General

Eliminated in primary 
Bill Dahn, perennial candidate

Results

Republican primary 
The first Republican to enter the race was MyPillow General Counsel and 2018 Republican nominee Doug Wardlow on February 16, 2021. Wardlow announced his run in a video on Twitter, blaming Ellison for unrest in the Twin Cities following the murder of George Floyd.

Former State Representative Dennis Smith of Maple Grove announced his run for attorney general on June 7, 2021. In a campaign video, he emphasized his desire to promote trust in the attorney general's office and depoliticize the office.

A month later on July 6, 2021, Lynne Torgerson, a lawyer from Minneapolis, announced her run. She called COVID-19 restrictions "destructive" and accused Ellison of "threatening Minnesotans’ freedoms and rights."

Private lawyer Jim Schultz of Minnetonka announced his run for the office on December 9, 2021. It was Schultz's first run for office, and his campaign was chaired by former Minnesota Republican Party Chair Ron Eibensteiner.

The final major candidate to enter the race was former state legislator, and Hennepin County commissioner, and Washington County judge Tad Jude. He announced his run for attorney general on January 31, 2022.

Candidates

Nominee
Jim Schultz, business lawyer (endorsed by state party)

Eliminated in primary 
Sharon Anderson, Republican nominee for attorney general in 1994
Doug Wardlow, former state representative and nominee for attorney general in 2018

Withdrew at convention
Tad Jude, former judge of the 10th district court of Minnesota (subsequently withdrew and endorsed Schultz) (unsuccessfully ran for Hennepin County Attorney)
Dennis Smith, former state representative (subsequently withdrew and endorsed Schultz)

Endorsements

Polling

Debate
A debate was held on March 31 at the Providence Academy Performing Arts Center. Jude, Schultz and Wardlow were in attendance.

Results

Independents

Candidates

Declined
Richard Painter, University of Minnesota Law School professor, former White House ethics lawyer under President George W. Bush, and candidate for U.S. Senate in 2018 (running for Congress)

General election

Predictions

Endorsements

Polling
Graphical summary

Keith Ellison vs. Doug Wardlow

Results

Results by county

See also 
 2022 Minnesota elections

Notes

References

External links
Elections & Voting - Minnesota Secretary of State

Official campaign websites
Keith Ellison (DFL) for Attorney General
Jim Schultz (R) for Attorney General

Minnesota Attorney General elections
Attorney General
Minnesota